Svetly is a rural locality (a settlement) and the administrative center of Svetlinsky District, Orenburg Oblast, Russia. Population:

Geography
Lake Shalkar-Yega-Kara is located just to the south of the village, near the Kazakhstan–Russia border.

References

Notes

Sources

Rural localities in Orenburg Oblast